Trade dispute may mean:

 Labor dispute, a disagreement between an employer and employees regarding the terms of employment
 Trade war, an economic conflict between nations over the trade of the nations' goods, services, and/or citizenry